Villalba del Rey is a municipality located in the province of Cuenca, Castile-La Mancha, Spain. It is part of the natural region of La Alcarria. According to the 2004 census (INE), the municipality has a population of 662 inhabitants.
Formerly known as Villalba de Huete, it became independent in 1411 and acquired its present name.
Local economy is based in agriculture, sheep husbandry and beekeeping; with the main produce being cereals, olive oil, sunflower oil, honey and wine.

Main buildings

 Immaculate Conception Hermitage: Simple gothic hermitage with square base.
 Assumption of Mary Church:Church of three naves and latin cross base from the 16th and 17th centuries. Inside, baroque altarpiece from the 18th century.

Local holidays and folklore
 Saint Sebastian: January 20.
 Holy Week: Traditional processions of Maundy Thursday, the Gathering and Good Friday.
 Saint Isidore the Laborer: May 15.
 Nuestra Señora de los Portentos: First Sunday in September.

References

Municipalities in the Province of Cuenca